Madison Heights is a census-designated place (CDP) in Amherst County, Virginia, United States. The population was 10,893 at the 2020 census. It is part of the Lynchburg Metropolitan Statistical Area.

History
Fort Riverview (44AH91 and 44AH195), Galt's Mill Complex, Oak Lawn, and Hanshill are listed on the National Register of Historic Places.

Mt. Sinai Baptist Church is a historically Black church in Madison Heights. In 1974, the pastor was Rev. Roger Ford.

Geography
Madison Heights is located at  (37.439406, −79.117259).

Demographics
As of the census of 2000, there were 11,584 people, 4,451 households, and 3,182 families residing in the CDP. The population density was 600.7 people per square mile (232.0/km2). There were 4,656 housing units at an average density of 241.5/sq mi (93.2/km2). The racial makeup of the CDP was 77.80% White, 19.57% African American, 0.66% Native American, 0.45% Asian, 0.58% from other races, and 0.94% from two or more races. Hispanic or Latino of any race were 0.89% of the population.

There were 4,451 households, out of which 30.1% had children under the age of 18 living with them, 53.2% were married couples living together, 14.1% had a female householder with no husband present, and 28.5% were non-families. 24.3% of all households were made up of individuals, and 10.0% had someone living alone who was 65 years of age or older. The average household size was 2.45 and the average family size was 2.88.

In the CDP, the population was spread out, with 21.9% under the age of 18, 7.6% from 18 to 24, 29.1% from 25 to 44, 26.1% from 45 to 64, and 15.2% who were 65 years of age or older. The median age was 40 years. For every 100 females, there were 91.9 males. For every 100 females age 18 and over, there were 90.2 males.

The median income for a household in the CDP was $32,359, and the median income for a family was $39,415. Males had a median income of $30,340 versus $22,009 for females. The per capita income for the CDP was $15,589. About 7.2% of families and 9.2% of the population were below the poverty line, including 10.6% of those under age 18 and 9.5% of those age 65 or over.

Education
Madison Heights is served by Amherst County Public Schools, with Monelison Middle School, Amelon Elementary School, and Madison Heights Elementary School located in Madison Heights.  Temple Christian School is a private school located on the grounds of Temple Baptist Church.

Central Virginia Training Center
The Central Virginia Training Center is a state education facility in Madison Heights. Previously it was known as the Virginia State Colony for Epileptics and Feebleminded where forced sterilizations were conducted, 8,300 from 1924 to 1972 on those determined to be "unfit".

Carrie Buck, the plaintiff in the United States Supreme Court case Buck v. Bell, was sterilized after being classified as "feeble-minded", as part of the state's eugenics program while she was a patient at the Colony.  The story of Carrie Buck's sterilization and the court case was made into a television drama in 1994, Against Her Will: The Carrie Buck Story. "Virginia State Epileptic Colony," a song by the Manic Street Preachers on their 2009 album Journal for Plague Lovers, addresses the state's program of eugenics.

Notable people
Clay Bryant, baseball player, manager, and coach.
Randy Tomlin, former pitcher for the Pittsburgh Pirates.

References

Census-designated places in Amherst County, Virginia
Populated places on the James River (Virginia)